Joseph Paul Franklin (born James Clayton Vaughn Jr.; April 13, 1950 – November 20, 2013) was an American neo-Nazi and serial killer who engaged in a murder spree spanning the late 1970s and early 1980s.

Franklin was convicted of several murders and received four life sentences, as well as two death sentences. He also confessed to the attempted murders of magazine publisher and pornographer Larry Flynt in 1978 and civil rights activist Vernon Jordan in 1980. Both survived their injuries, but Flynt was left permanently paralyzed from the waist down. Franklin was not convicted in either of those highly publicized cases, and he made his confessions years after the crimes had occurred.

Franklin was on Missouri's death row for 15 years awaiting execution for the 1977 murder of Gerald Gordon. He was executed by lethal injection on November 20, 2013.

Early life
James Clayton Vaughn Jr. was born in Mobile, Alabama, on April 13, 1950, the elder son of James Clayton Vaughn Sr. and Helen Rau Vaughn, and brother to Carolyn, Marilyn, and Gordon. Vaughn's father was a World War II veteran and butcher who left the family when Vaughn was aged eight. His sister Carolyn recalled, "Whenever [Vaughn Sr.] came to visit he'd beat us," and their mother had Vaughn Sr. jailed twice for public drunkenness. Vaughn's mother was described by a family friend as "a full-blooded German, a real strict, perfectionist lady. I never saw her beat any of [her children], but they told me stories."

Vaughn later stated that he was rarely given enough to eat and suffered severe physical abuse as a child, and that his mother "didn't care about [him and his siblings]". He claimed that these factors stunted his emotional development, and said he had "always been least ten years or more behind other people in their maturity."

As early as high school, Vaughn developed an interest in evangelical Christianity, then in Nazism, and later held memberships in both the National Socialist White People's Party and the Ku Klux Klan. He eventually changed his name to "Joseph Paul Franklin" in honor of Paul Joseph Goebbels and Benjamin Franklin. In the 1960s, Franklin was inspired to start a race war after reading Adolf Hitler's Mein Kampf. "I've never felt that way about any other book that I read," he later reflected. "It was something weird about that book."

In the early 1970s, he took a road trip to an American Nazi Party conference in Virginia with David Duke (then a student) and Don Black.

Crimes
For much of his life, Franklin was a drifter, roaming the East Coast seeking chances to "cleanse the world" of people he considered inferior, especially black people and Jewish people. His primary source of financial support appears to have been bank robberies. Franklin supplemented his income from criminal acts with paid blood bank donations, which eventually led to his subsequent capture by the FBI.

1977
 July 29, 1977: Franklin firebombed Beth Shalom Synagogue in Chattanooga, Tennessee, destroying it. Loss of life was prevented because some of the worshippers left early that Friday evening and as a result, there were not enough worshippers for a minyan.
 August 7, 1977: Franklin shot and killed a young interracial couple, Alphonse Manning Jr. and Toni Schwenn, in a parking lot at East Towne Mall in Madison, Wisconsin. 
 October 8, 1977: In suburban St. Louis, Missouri, Franklin hid in the bushes near Brith Sholom Kneseth Israel synagogue and fired on a group attending services. In this incident, Franklin killed 42-year-old Gerald Gordon. He also wounded Steven Goldman and William Ash.

1978
March 6, 1978: Franklin, according to his later account, used a Ruger .44 caliber semi-automatic rifle to ambush Hustler publisher Larry Flynt and his lawyer Gene Reeves in Lawrenceville, Georgia. In his confession, Franklin said this was in retaliation for an edition of Hustler displaying interracial sex. Neither Franklin nor anyone else was ever charged in that shooting.
July 29, 1978: Franklin hid near a Pizza Hut in Chattanooga, Tennessee, and shot and killed Bryant Tatum, a Black man, with a 12-gauge shotgun; he also shot Tatum's white girlfriend, Nancy Hilton, who survived. Franklin later confessed and pleaded guilty, being given a life sentence, as well as a sentence for an unrelated armed robbery in 1977.

1979
Franklin confessed but was not tried or sentenced for this crime. Franklin said that McIver was in close contact with white women, so he murdered him.
October 21, 1979: Franklin killed Jesse E. Taylor, a black man and his white wife Marion Bresette in Oklahoma City, Oklahoma.

1980
May 29, 1980: Franklin (according to him) shot and seriously wounded civil rights activist and Urban League president Vernon Jordan after seeing him with a white woman in Fort Wayne, Indiana. Franklin initially denied any part in the crime and was acquitted, but later confessed.
June 8, 1980: Franklin killed cousins Darrell Lane (14) and Dante Evans Brown (13) in Cincinnati, Ohio. Waiting on an overpass to shoot a racially mixed couple, he shot the boys instead, a crime to which he later confessed. He was convicted in 1998 and received two life sentences for these murders.
June 15, 1980: Franklin shot and killed Arthur Smothers (22) and Kathleen Mikula (16) with a high-powered rifle as the couple walked across the Washington Street Bridge in Johnstown, Pennsylvania. Smothers was Black; Mikula was white. On the day of the murder, Franklin took a concealed position on a wooded hillside overlooking downtown Johnstown and waited for potential targets to enter his line of sight. He was never arrested for these murders, but he confessed to them during a jailhouse interview after he was apprehended.
June 25, 1980: Franklin used a .44 Ruger pistol to kill two hitchhikers, Nancy Santomero (19) and Vicki Durian (26), in Pocahontas County, West Virginia. He confessed to the crime in 1997 to an Ohio assistant prosecutor in the course of investigation in another case. He said he picked up the white women and decided to kill them after one said she had a black boyfriend. Jacob Beard of Florida was convicted and imprisoned in 1993 on these charges. He was freed in 1999 and a new trial was ordered based on Franklin's confession.
August 20, 1980: Franklin killed two Black men, Ted Fields and David Martin, near Liberty Park located in Salt Lake City, Utah. He was tried on federal civil rights charges as well as state first-degree murder charges.

Apprehension, conviction, and imprisonment
Following the two murders in Utah, Franklin returned to the midwestern U.S. Traveling through Kentucky, he was detained and questioned regarding a firearm that he was transporting in his car. Franklin fled from this interrogation, but authorities recovered sufficient evidence from the vehicle to point suspicions that potentially linked him to the sniper killings. His conspicuous racist tattoos, coupled with his habit of visiting blood banks, led investigators to issue a nationwide alert to blood banks. In October 1980, the tattoos drew the attention of a Florida blood bank worker, who contacted the FBI. Franklin was arrested in Lakeland on October 28, 1980.

Franklin tried to escape during the judgment of the 1997 Missouri trial on charges of murdering Gerald Gordon. He was convicted of the murder charge. The psychiatrist Dorothy Otnow Lewis, who had interviewed him at length, testified for the defense that she believed that he was a paranoid schizophrenic and unfit to stand trial. Lewis noted his delusional thinking and a childhood history of severe abuse. In October 2013, Flynt called for clemency for Franklin, asserting "that a government that forbids killing among its citizens should not be in the business of killing people itself."

Franklin was held on death row at the Potosi Correctional Center near Mineral Point, Missouri. In August 2013, the Missouri Supreme Court announced that Franklin would be executed on November 20. Missouri Attorney General Chris Koster said in a statement that by setting execution dates, the state high court "has taken an important step to see that justice is finally done for the victims and their families".

Execution
Franklin's execution was affected by the European Union export ban when the German drug manufacturer Fresenius Kabi was obliged to refuse having their drugs used for lethal injections. In response, Missouri announced that it would use for Franklin's execution a new method of lethal injection, which used a single drug provided by an unnamed compounding pharmacy.

A day before his execution, U.S. District Judge Nanette Laughrey (Jefferson City) granted a stay of execution over concerns raised about the new method of execution. A second stay was granted that evening by US District Judge Carol E. Jackson (St. Louis), based on Franklin's claim that he was too mentally incompetent to be executed. An appeals court quickly overturned both stays, and the Supreme Court subsequently rejected his final appeals.

In an interview with the St. Louis Post-Dispatch newspaper published on November 17, 2013, Franklin said he had renounced his racist views. He said his motivation had been "illogical" and was partly a consequence of an abusive upbringing. He said he had interacted with black people in prison, adding: "I saw they were people just like us."

Franklin was executed at the Eastern Reception, Diagnostic and Correctional Center in Bonne Terre, Missouri, on November 20, 2013. The execution began at 6:07 a.m. CST and he was pronounced dead at 6:17 a.m. His execution was the first lethal injection in Missouri to use pentobarbital alone instead of the conventional three drug cocktail. 
An Associated Press agency report said that  of the barbiturate pentobarbital was administered.

Three media witnesses said Franklin did not seem to show pain. He did not make any final written statement and did not speak a word in the death chamber. After the injection, he blinked a few times, breathed heavily a few times, and swallowed hard, the witnesses said.  The heaving of his chest slowed, and finally stopped, they said.

Representation in other media
Hunter (1989), a novel by the white supremacist William L. Pierce, revolves around protagonist Oscar Yeager, a racist serial killer who murders interracial couples. Pierce, founder of the National Alliance and author of a similarly themed novel, The Turner Diaries, dedicated the book to Joseph Paul Franklin, and said of Franklin that "he saw his duty as a white man and did what a responsible son of his race must do." In the 1996 film The People vs. Larry Flynt, Franklin was portrayed by Czech actor Jan Tříska. In 2009, Franklin appeared in the MSNBC TV series Criminal Mindscape.

See also 
 Capital punishment in Missouri
 Capital punishment in the United States
 List of people executed in Missouri
 List of people executed in the United States in 2013
 List of homicides in Wisconsin
General:
 List of serial killers by number of victims
 List of serial killers in the United States

References

Further reading
Mel Ayton, Dark Soul of the South: The Life and Crimes of Racist Killer Joseph Paul Franklin, Potomac Press, Inc., 2011
Ralph Kennedy Echols, Life Without Mercy: Jake Beard, Joseph Paul Franklin and the Rainbow Murders, Kennedy Books, Scottsdale, AZ, 2014

External links

, Court TV: police photography

Malcolm Gladwell, "Damaged", New Yorker, February 24, 1997

Serial Killers - Part 4: White Supremacist Joseph Franklin, FBI
Serial Killer's Survivor: Prosecutor Raped Me During the Trial

1950 births
2013 deaths
20th-century American criminals
21st-century executions by Missouri
21st-century executions of American people
American arsonists
American bank robbers
American criminal snipers
American escapees
American male criminals
American murderers of children
American Nazi Party members
American prisoners sentenced to life imprisonment
Escapees from Missouri detention
Executed American serial killers
Executed people from Alabama
Former white supremacists
Former Ku Klux Klan members
Male serial killers
People convicted of murder by Missouri
People executed by Missouri by lethal injection
People from Mobile, Alabama
People from St. Louis County, Missouri
People from Washington County, Missouri
Race and crime in the United States
Racially motivated violence in the United States
American Ku Klux Klan members